Zahra Dardouri (born Boumaza on 6 February 1955 in Batna) is an Algerian teacher, politician and former minister.

Career
In 2014, Zohra Dardouri was appointed Minister of Post and Telecommunications by President Bouteflika together with six other women ministers. She focused on the implementation of information and communication technologies in the more isolated areas of Algeria and on providing a stable and fast Internet connection throughout the country. On 14 May 2015, she left the government following a reshuffle.

References

Living people
Government ministers of Algeria
21st-century Algerian women politicians
Women government ministers of Algeria
21st-century Algerian politicians
1955 births